The Jimmy V Award (sometimes called the Jimmy V Award for Perseverance) is awarded as part of the ESPY Awards to "a deserving member of the sporting world who has overcome great obstacles through perseverance and determination". The award is named in honor of North Carolina State University men's basketball coach Jim Valvano, who gave an acceptance speech after receiving the Arthur Ashe Courage Award at the 1993 ESPY Awards ceremony which "brought a howling, teary-eyed Madison Square Garden to its feet". Valvano died from adenocarcinoma two months after receiving the award. The Jimmy V Award trophy, designed by sculptor Lawrence Nowlan, is presented at the annual awards ceremony in Los Angeles by The V Foundation, a charitable organization founded in 1993 by ESPN and Valvano to raise money to fund cancer research grants across the United States.

The accolade's inaugural winner in 2007 was basketball coach Kay Yow, who successfully led the North Carolina State University women's team to the ACC tournament championship game, and the Sweet 16 (regional semi-finals) of the NCAA Division I Tournament after returning from sessions of breast cancer chemotherapy. Although the award has usually been given to coaches or athletes, it has been presented to two reporters: Stuart Scott (2014) and Craig Sager (2016). The award has been shared twice: Team Hoyt (2013), consisting of the father and son team of Dick and Rick Hoyt, and the father and daughter combination of Devon Still and Leah Still (2015). The 2022 recipient of the Jimmy V Award was Dick Vitale, an college basketball commentator who was declared cancer-free in April 2022 following diagnoses of melanoma and lymphoma.

Recipients

References

External links
 

Awards established in 2007
ESPY Awards